Endless Ocean 2: Adventures of the Deep, also known in North America as Endless Ocean: Blue World and Japan as , is a scuba diving video game for Wii and the sequel to Endless Ocean, previously released for Wii in 2007. It was first revealed at a Nintendo conference held on October 2, 2008. The game was released as part of the Touch! Generations series of games in the United Kingdom and Europe.

Gameplay 

Adventures of the Deep features improved and more realistic graphics and larger explorable areas than the previous game. Adventures of the Deep allows players to travel to twelve different diving spots around the globe, including new polar and freshwater locations.

The ability to dive with a dolphin as a companion returns from the first game, and players will now also be able to ride them to move quickly through the water. Players can also now sell salvaged treasure, including legendary artifacts for money that can be used to buy items such as new styles of diving suits, items used to decorate their island and private reef, and to help the player to be capable of diving for a longer time and with less risk of receiving damage from hostile creatures, running out of oxygen, or getting lost, among others. The aquarium returns and the player can now walk outside the tanks. Several new areas are introduced, for example with the Marine Life Annex, you can put shore species such as penguins, shorebirds and seals. Another new area is the Small World, where smaller fish and invertebrates can be displayed. Potentially dangerous creatures such as sharks, crocodiles, and electric eels will now elicit a warning for players and may even attack them; players will be able to drive them off using a new tranquilizer-like tool called the Pulsar that can shoot electric charges which calms them down. The Pulsar can also be used to heal any creatures the player finds that are sick or injured.

Adventures of the Deep features a variety of animals, including dolphins, whales, sea lions, penguins, manatees, sharks, sea turtles, and more, with around 400 different species of fish, mammals, birds, invertebrates, reptiles and amphibians. There are also 30 legendary creatures to be found in various regions of the game: a select few play a role in the game's storyline and can be interacted with at any time afterwards, but most require a special condition to be met before they can be found.

Adventures of the Deep features online cooperative multiplayer that allows players to communicate using the Wii Speak peripheral, with which the game was bundled for a short time. As with the first game, players will also be able to take pictures during their dives; the pictures can now be saved to an SD card.

Plot 
The plot of Adventures of the Deep revolves around a Pacific Legend known as the Song of Dragons. The player character, a university student studying folklore, takes leave from their studies to visit the Paoul Republic in the South Pacific, intrigued by the legend. By chance, they apply for a job at R&R Diving Service, run by Jean-Eric Rouvier and his granddaughter Océane. During the player's entrance examination dive, Océane drops a lapis lazuli pendant left to her by her late father Matthieu; the pendant omits a strange sound, after which a nearby humpback whale becomes aggressive. Curious, she disregards Jean-Eric's warnings and attempts to retrieve a second pendant lost as a child, only to be threatened by an aggressive tiger shark. The player is able to drive off the shark, and the pendant is recovered. Deciding to have the two pendants appraised, R&R contacts Nancy Young, a local trader, who suggests that they search for Valka Castle, which sank beneath the waves in the 17th century, for further clues.

Traveling to the Aegean Sea, the group encounters Gary 'GG' Gray, a famous American salvager, who challenges them to see who can find Valka Castle first. The player and Océane successfully discover the castle while trying to escape the man eating great white shark Thanatos, where they uncover an ancient lapis lazuli tablet and hear a strange sound before they are temporarily sealed in a room by a trap left by the castle's ruler. Encountering GG again following their escape, he reveals that the tablet originates from an ancient sea-faring civilization known as the Okeanides. R&R returns home, and Nancy recommends that the group consult professor Hayoko Sakurai to have the tablet translated. Traveling to Hayoko's current workplace, an aquarium in Japan, she agrees to decipher the tablet in return for R&R completing her research on polar bears for her. After traveling to the northern coast of Canada and completing her research, Hayaoko joins R&R Diving Service and reveals that the tablet says that the Song of Dragons is the key to the Pacifia Treasure, a legendary treasure left by the Okeanides. Following reports of the song being heard in the Antarctic, the group travels there to investigate further. While investigating, the player hears a strange sound they had previously heard while at Valka Castle, and realizes that it is the Song of Dragons. They help rescue a spectacled porpoise, which subsequently helps R&R navigate their way out of a heavy snowstorm. Upon returning home, Jean-Eric forbids any further investigation into the legend, believing that it will only lead to bad luck. He privately confesses to the player that Matthieu had attempted to discover the Pacifia Treasure himself, which lead to a falling out with Jean Eric, who dismissed the Treasure as a myth; Matthieu later died during his investigation when his submarine broke down.

The next morning, R&R receives an unexpected visitor in the form of GG, who explains that he has been searching for the Pacifia Treasure for the past 10 years, and offers to work with R&R in locating it. Following a lead in South America, the player and GG swim upstream a tributary of the Amazon River, where they discover an ancient ruin behind a waterfall and uncover a second lapis lazuli tablet. GG and the player are attacked by a spectacled caiman, but the player is able to drive it off. Giving the tablet to Hayoko, she deciphers that the Okeanides were able to communicate with and control dragons using an item known as the Dragon Flute; the flute was dismantled into three pieces and thrown into the deepest depths of the sea in order to protect the royal treasure the dragons guarded. Océane realizes that the two pendants her father left her are actually pieces of the Dragon Flute, and Jean-Eric reveals that the final piece is within Matthieu's submarine. After returning home, Jean-Eric resolves to help Océane find the Pacifia Treasure so that he can come to terms with his past, and R&R travel to the Red Sea to recover the final piece. Diving to the depths of the region, the player is forced to dislodge a giant squid impeding their progress by luring a sperm whale to it, and successfully recovers the final piece of the flute from the submarine wreckage, alongside a farewell message from Matthieu to Jean-Eric.

Returning home, the group realises that when projected onto Anaximander's Map of the Circular Earth (a copy of which exists in Valka Castle), the grooves in the Dragon Flute indicate a location in the Red Sea. R&R returns to investigate. The player identifies a large empty space beneath a long fissure, but it is blocked off by a thin bedrock wall at the end. Identifying metal in the wall, R&R realises it is something referred to in one of the tablets, and blows the wall up with dynamite; however, the player must wait until the next day to investigate further in order to allow the debris to settle. The following morning, at the player's suggestion, R&R wakes at dawn, when a large number of whales and dolphins are congregating in the area. The group swims through a tunnel and into a large cavern, where a huge temple is submerged. The group enters the temple, but find themselves sucked in by strong currents. Upon entering the temple, the group realises that the radio does not work, meaning they can no longer communicate with Jean-Eric. Exploring the temple, the group finds a series of altars. The player plays the Dragon Flute to several of them, but each time the currents change direction and whisk someone away. Eventually, everyone ends up back at the entrance, where the radio now works again. Following an inscription, it is discovered that one of the altars includes a metal symbol, which has been blocking the radio signal. GG turns it, opening a passageway through a subterranean chamber into another altar. The temple being symmetrical, the group eventually ends up at the foyer on the other side from the entrance. Following another inscription, the player presses a brick which opens the large central hall, above which is a smaller hall, which is locked. WHile GG looks for a mechanism, three goblin sharks, one of which is very large, enter and threaten the group, but they are driven away. GG finds the mechanism and opens the chamber, which is covered in heiroglyphs. Hayako interprets this as a mythologised history of the people who built the temple. When the Dragon Flute is played, the goblin sharks return, sealing the chamber. Hayako notes three statues around the room are the three forms of Ra. The player successfully calms the sharks and deposits the three parts of the flute in the statues, re-opening the chamber and driving the sharks away. At this point, an unknown species of whale enters, which looks something like a juvenile albino humpback whale. It and all the others of its species in the temple begin singing the Song of Dragons, which Oceana deduces is a product of echolocation. The group all turns a large wheel in the centre of the room, which causes all the whales in the area, inside and outside the temple, to bang their heads on the building, opening the treasure chamber. However, before the group can salvage it, they realise the temple will soon collapse and they must escape. Discovering a symmetrical hall on the other side of the chamber, the group attempts to escape, and, after receiving a message on the radio telling Oceana to use a mechanism in a crack next to an image of Set, they succeed. Jean-Eric explains that his signal was jammed, so the person on the radio couldn't have been him, and the group discuss their plans to reopen the temple, salvage the treasure and learn the true secrets of the people who built it.

Music 
Endless Ocean 2: Adventures of the Deep features a soundtrack by the musical ensemble Celtic Woman, including Andrea Corr. Unlike its predecessor, however, Adventures of the Deep does not allow players to create a custom soundtrack using the music on an SD card.

Reception 

The game received "generally favorable reviews" according to the review aggregation website Metacritic.

Famitsu was the first media outlet to review Adventures of the Deep, doing so shortly before its release in Japan. They gave the game a score 36 out of 40, one point higher than Endless Ocean, with all four reviewers giving the game nine points each. Eurogamer called it a "genuinely peaceful and relaxing experience", though comparing it to "a cool adventure holiday for all ages." Official Nintendo Magazine was slightly more critical of the game, calling the game "batty ... but hardly enthralling" but also "truly fun, but not entirely action-packed". They also gave good reports of thrill and graphics involved in the game, which resulted in the game getting a slightly higher score than its predecessor.

References

External links 

2009 video games
Arika games
Nintendo games
Nintendo Wi-Fi Connection games
Scuba diving video games
Touch! Generations
Video game sequels
Video games developed in Japan
Video games featuring protagonists of selectable gender
Video games set in Brazil
Video games set in Antarctica
Video games with underwater settings
Wii games
Wii-only games
Wii Speak games
Multiplayer and single-player video games